John Heffernan (born 30 June 1981) is a British actor. He has worked with the English Touring Theatre, the Royal Shakespeare Company, and the National Theatre, taking the lead roles in Edward II at the National Theatre, and Oppenheimer with the RSC. 

Heffernan was born in Billericay, England and worked as an usher at the National Theatre. He has appeared on screen in a number of roles, including Henry Lascelles in the BBC adaptation of Susanna Clarke's novel Jonathan Strange & Mr Norrell, Jaggers in Dickensian and Steven Rose in the fourth series of Luther. In 2017, he played John Grigg, 2nd Baron Altrincham, in an episode of the Netflix series The Crown. He also played the Nine for Big Finish, in their Doctor Who box sets Doom Coalition and Ravenous. He returned to the National Theatre in 2022 to play the co-lead opposite Katherine Parkinson in a new production of Much Ado About Nothing directed by Simon Godwin.

Filmography

Film

Television

Video games

References

External links
 

21st-century British male actors
British male stage actors
British male television actors
Living people
People from Billericay
1981 births
Royal Shakespeare Company members